The Second Department of Polish General Staff (Polish: Oddział II Sztabu Generalnego Wojska Polskiego, also called Dwojka) was a department of the Polish General Staff in the Second Polish Republic. It was responsible for military intelligence, counterintelligence, cryptography, analysis of foreign military forces, and foreign affairs of the Polish Army. It existed from 1918 until 1939.

History 
In the second Polish Republic, the first intelligence units were formed soon after the creation of the General Staff of the Polish Army under General Tadeusz Rozwadowski. In mid-October 1918, the Information Department of the General Staff, was formed under Major Mieczysław Mackiewicz. It handled both offensive and defensive intelligence services, evidence, and military ciphers. Until c. 1921, the Polish military used the word “defensive”, while describing intelligence. Due to various political events, changes in the organizational structure of the General Staff in the early 1920s were frequent.

During the Polish-Soviet War and in the immediate postwar period, the Information Department had a well-developed network of informants and local units, reaching as far as China, Persia, Siberia and Japan. Following the Polish victory in the war, in which Polish intelligence played a significant role, the Information Department was expanded and renamed into the Second Department of the Polish General Staff. It also was restructured, and divided into the following departments: Organizational, Offensive A, Offensive B, Defensive, Foreign Propaganda, and Home.

Activities 
The Second Department cooperated with a number of both civilian and military institutions of the Second Polish Republic. Among them were Police, Ministry of Foreign Affairs, Straż Graniczna, Border Protection Corps and others. Since 1932, it also concentrated some of its efforts on industrial espionage, after the formation of Polish Agency of Trade Information.

Following Polish–Soviet War, the Second Department formed its outposts in main cities of the Soviet Union: Moscow, Leningrad, Kharkov, Kiev and Tiflis. Furthermore, with support from the Border Protection Corps, it carried out several raids along the Polish–Soviet border, established in 1921. The purpose of these raids was to find information about Soviet military installations, also to enroll agents or informants. In the early 1920s, Polish services managed to convince an ethnic Pole, Bolesław Kontrym, who commanded Red Army’s 28th Rifle Brigade, to change sides. Kontrym crossed the border, and was soon employed by the Polish Police.

Beginning in 1919, the Department actively operated against Germany, with 30 outposts located there. The most important was the outpost in Berlin, called In.3. It was headed by Jerzy Sosnowski, who came there in the spring of 1926. In 1924 – 27, Bydgoszcz office of the Department, commanded by Major Marian Steifer, successfully carried out Operation Cart (Operacja Wozek), during which German correspondence between Berlin and East Prussia was controlled. In April 1939, the Independent Situational Office Germany (Samodzielny Referat Sytuacyjny Niemcy) was formed. This office gathered all kinds of information regarding Nazi Germany, presenting daily and weekly reports to the Polish General Staff and the government. Since mid-June 1939, daily meetings took place at the office, with reports sent to Polish Commander-in-chief.

Before WWI, radio intelligence was an important source of information. Polish cryptologists managed to break the codes of German Enigma machine. On July 25, 1939, in a forest near Pyry, Polish experts handed a copy of Enigma to French and British specialists in Pyry (see also Biuro Szyfrów).

Structure

Organisational structure 
At the time the department was closed in 1939, it comprised a number of bureaus and sub-departments. The chain of command consisted of the department's director, followed by the first deputy and second deputy. The head office was supported by the Organizational Bureau, Training Bureau, and Budget Bureau, as well as the chancellery and its archive. The departments independent Bureau's included: the General Independent Bureau, Independent Technical Bureau, and Independent Situational Bureau Germany. Its sub-departments consisted of:

 Intelligence Department IIA: consisting of Bureau East and Bureau West
 Counter-Intelligence Department IIB: consisting of the General Office, National Bureau, Inspection Bureau, Central Agency Bureau, and Central File Office
 Intelligence Planning Department III: consisting of the Bureau of Intelligence Planning, Bureau of Diversionary Planning, and Bureau of Propaganda Planning
 Studies Department IV: consisting of the Independent Bureau Germany, Independent Bureau Russia, and Independent Bureau of General Studies
 Cipher and Radio-Intelligence Department: consisting of Bureau B.S.1, Bureau B.S.2, Bureau B.S.3, and Bureau B.S.4

Territorial structure 
The territorial structure of the Second Department of the Polish General Staff was divided into Samodzielne Referaty Informacyjne (SRI; English: Independent Information Offices), outposts, posts, branches. Also, its officers operated in Polish Army garrisons, and outposts of the Border Protection Corps.

 Office 1 in Wilno, which was responsible for intelligence in the Soviet Union, Latvia and Lithuania. It was commanded by Major Stefan Mayer and Major Edmund Piotrowski. This branch had posts in several locations of northeastern Poland: Grodno, Wilno, Głębokie, Mołodeczno, Stołpce, Łuniniec, Osowiec.
 Office 2 in Warsaw, commanded by Captain Edmund Charaszkiewicz and Captain Jan Żychoń.
 Office 3 Poznań (since 1930 in Bydgoszcz, which was responsible for intelligence in Germany, commanded by Major Marian Steifer (1924–1927) and Captain Jan Żychoń (1933 – September 1939). This branch had posts in several locations of northwestern Poland: Mława, Grudziądz, Starogard, Poznań, Leszno, Białystok, Free City of Danzig, also outposts at Polish Consulates in Schneidemuhl (Piła) and Marienwerder (Kwidzyn).
 Office 4 in Kraków (since 1930 in Katowice), which was responsible for intelligence in Germany and Czechoslovakia. Commanded by Captain Jan Żychoń and Captain Stanislaw Kuniczak, it had posts in Chorzów, Cieszyn and Nowy Targ.
 Office in Lwów, which was responsible for intelligence in the Soviet Union. Commanded by Major Bogdan Szeligowski and Major Józef Bińkowski, it had posts in several towns of southeastern Poland: Sarny, Równe, Czortków, Tarnopol, Stryj and Sanok (since March 1939),
 Office 5 in Brzesc Litewski (on June 1, 1926, it was subjected to the Wilno Branch),
 Office 6 in Łódź, created soon before the German Invasion of Poland. Commanded by Major Witold Langenfeld, it had posts in Ostrów Wielkopolski and Częstochowa,
 Office 7 in the Free City of Danzig. Also called Gdansk Bureau of Information (BIG; Polish: Biuro Informacji Gdańsk), it existed from 1925 until 1930, and was commanded by Major Karol Dubicz-Penther. The activities of this office were concentrated in German Pomerania, East Prussia and Gdansk.

Loss of archives in September 1939 
During the 1939 Invasion of Poland, the Abwehr was extremely interested in the archives of the department. As the Germans had failed to capture the documents of Czechoslovak military intelligence (in March 1939 they were transported by air to Britain), Admiral Wilhelm Canaris decided to form small groups of agents, which were attached to the frontline Wehrmacht units. Their task was to immediately seize all kinds of documents. Main group of such agents was commanded by Major Oskar Reile, Abwehr resident in the Free City of Danzig.

In Bydgoszcz, captured by the Germans on September 5, the agents immediately occupied offices of the local branch of the Department, headed by Jan Zychon. They failed to seize any documents, except for the business card of Zychon himself, left on a desk.

Warsaw capitulated on September 28, and a group of Abwehr agents immediately entered the office of the Department, located on Pilsudski Square. After opening over one hundred armoured wardrobes, they only came across a bunch of worthless German documents, such as train schedules, telephone directories, press articles and forms. Soon afterwards, however, one of the German agents, Captain Bulang, decided to check the so-called Legions Fort, located on Zakroczymska Street. To his surprise, he found there the documents of the Bydgoszcz office of the Department. They had been evacuated by Zychon, who abandoned all papers there.

Altogether, the documents filled six trucks. After initial selection and analysis, all were transported to Germany, and soon afterwards, first arrests of Polish agents took place. Most of the agents were beheaded. The analysys of the documents enabled the Germans to expose weaknesses within their own intelligence, and improve the procedures. As Walter Schellenberg later recalled, after the return from Warsaw, where he had taken part in the victory parade (October 5, 1939), he analyzed the captured documents for two days. In his opinion, the quantity and quality of the archives was astounding, especially the information about German war industry, gathered by Polish agents.

With Polish documents in hand, the Germans managed to arrest several agents, including an ethnic Pole, living in Germany, who was a manager in one of the factories. Altogether, over 100 people were arrested, most of them were executed. Among those executed was Paulina Tyszewska, secretary and lover of a high ranking Abwehr officer from Danzig. Another agent, Abwehr Colonel Gunther Rudloff, who had cooperated with Jerzy Sosnowski, committed suicide after arrest.

List of directors 
 Ignacy Matuszewski, July 1920 – August 1923
 Michał Bajer, August 1923 – May 1926
 Jerzy Ferek-Błeszyński, May 1926 – November 1926
 Tadeusz Schaetzel, November 1926 – January 1929
 Tadeusz Pełczyński, January 1929 – February 1932
 Teodor Furgalski, February 1932–1934
 Jerzy Englisch, 1934 – October 1935
 Tadeusz Pełczyński, October 1935 – January 1939
 Józef Smoleński, February 1939 – September 1939

References

Sources 
 
 
 
 

Military of Poland
Defunct Polish intelligence agencies
Military intelligence agencies
Government agencies established in 1918
Government agencies disestablished in 1939